Florian Zimmer is a noted German-born magician.

Notable performances 
 Zimmer appeared on the 2008 television program, the 2008 World Magic Awards.

Awards 
 Siegfried & Roy Golden Lion Award
 European Champion of Magic
 German Champion
 Merlin Award 2009
 World Magic Award 2009
 Golden Rings of Lausane
 Marc Klasser Award – Monte Carlo Magic Stars
 Colombe D`or

References 
 Official Homepage
 FlorianZimmer-Group

External links
 Artikel über Zimmer bei Deutsche-Welle-TV
 Artikel über Zimmer in der „Südwest Presse“
 ARD
 crew-united, Filmnachweis "Smash it-leben oder sterben"
 Florian Zimmer's website

German magicians
Living people
Year of birth missing (living people)